Donald Mitchell (23 February 1955 – 18 November 2010) was an Australian weightlifter. He competed in the men's heavyweight II event at the 1980 Summer Olympics.

Don was a teacher of sport and Principal at Wingham High School, he had been Deputy Principal at The Hills Sports High and Deputy at JJ Cahill Memorial High. He was a non-Executive Director at ANZ Stadium in Sydney and was involved with the Academy of Western Sydney Sport and NSW Institute of Sport.

References

External links
 

1955 births
2010 deaths
Australian male weightlifters
Olympic weightlifters of Australia
Weightlifters at the 1980 Summer Olympics
Place of birth missing
20th-century Australian people
21st-century Australian people